The bay-chested warbling finch (Castanozoster thoracicus) is a species of bird in the family Thraupidae.
It is endemic to southeastern Brazil.

Its natural habitats are temperate forests and subtropical or tropical moist montane forests.

Taxonomy
The bay-chested warbling finch was formally described in 1835 by the Finnish naturalist Alexander von Nordmann from a specimen collected in Brazil. He coined the binomial name Frigilla thoracica. This species was traditionally placed in the genus Poospiza. A molecular phylogenetic study published in 2014 found that the genus was polyphyletic. In the subsequent reorganisation the bay-chested warbling finch was moved to its own newly erected genus Castanozoster. The name combines the Ancient Greek καστανό meaning "chestnut" with ζωστήρ meaning "belt". The bay-chested warbling finch is monotypic: no subspecies are recognised.

References

External links
Xeno-canto: audio recordings of the bay-chested warbling finch

bay-chested warbling finch
Birds of the Atlantic Forest
Endemic birds of Brazil
bay-chested warbling finch
bay-chested warbling finch
Taxonomy articles created by Polbot